Brandon Barkhuizen (born 9 August 1990) is a South African former soccer player who played as a defender for Bidvest Wits in the Premier Soccer League.

References

1990 births
South African soccer players
Living people
Association football defenders
Bidvest Wits F.C. players
Soccer players from Johannesburg